is a Japanese former athlete. She competed in the cycling at the 1988 Summer Olympics and the speed skating at the 1988 Winter Olympics.

References

External links
 

1966 births
Living people
Japanese female cyclists
Japanese female speed skaters
Olympic cyclists of Japan
Olympic speed skaters of Japan
Cyclists at the 1988 Summer Olympics
Speed skaters at the 1988 Winter Olympics
Asian Games silver medalists for Japan
Speed skaters at the 1986 Asian Winter Games
Speed skaters at the 1990 Asian Winter Games
Medalists at the 1986 Asian Winter Games
Medalists at the 1990 Asian Winter Games
Sportspeople from Hokkaido
Asian Games medalists in speed skating